Brian Piccolo Park is a sports venue located in Cooper City, Florida. The ground was opened in 1989 on 175.2-acre of land with the facilities of three soccer fields, two cricket fields, two basketball court as well as a velodrome.

In 2004, the ground played host to first-class cricket when the United States cricket team played Canadian cricket team in the ICC Intercontinental Cup. Since then the ground has hosted many non-first-class cricket matches. It also served as the home ground for the Florida Thunder a Pro Cricket team in 2004. The park is also home to one of the few cycling tracks in South Florida. The park also encompasses a skateboard park. It is considered one of the main centers for athletic activity in Broward County Parks.

Organizations 
Organizations founded in/for Brian Piccolo Park include:

 Florida Velodrome Association (FVA)

References

External links 
 
 Brian Piccolo Sports Park and Velodrome
 Cricketarchive
 Cricinfo

Cricket grounds in the United States
Sports venues in Broward County, Florida
Sports venues completed in 1989
1989 establishments in Florida
Soccer venues in Florida
Sports complexes in Florida
Cricket in Florida